The Murder at Zhdanovskaya is a 1992 Russian crime film directed by Sulambek Mamilov.

Plot 
The film takes place in 1980. It tells about the investigation into the murder of a KGB officer.

Cast 
 Ivan Bortnik as Gleb Yarin
 Vadim Zakharchenko as Andropov
 Boris Novikov as Mitrich
 Vladimir Ivashov as Viktor Vasilievitch
 Viktor Anisimov
 Anatoli Borodin as Tsykin
 Viktor Chervyakov as Tsykin
 Anton Golyshev as Andrei Sviyagin
 Natalya Goncharova
 Sergey Grekov
 Anatoliy Ivanov

References

External links 
 

1992 films
1990s Russian-language films
1992 crime drama films
Russian crime drama films